Callechelys is a genus of eels in the snake eel family Ophichthidae.  It currently contains the following fifteen species:

 Callechelys bilinearis Kanazawa, 1952 (Twostripe snake-eel)
 Callechelys bitaeniata (W. K. H. Peters, 1877)
 Callechelys catostoma (J. G. Schneider & J. R. Forster, 1801) (Black-striped snake-eel)
 Callechelys cliffi J. E. Böhlke & Briggs, 1954 (Sandy ridgefin eel)
 Callechelys eristigma McCosker & Rosenblatt, 1972 (Spotted ridgefin eel)
 Callechelys galapagensis McCosker & Rosenblatt, 1972
 Callechelys guineensis (Osório, 1893) (Shorttail snake eel)
 Callechelys leucoptera (Cadenat, 1954)
 Callechelys lutea Snyder, 1904 (Yellow-spotted snake-eel)
 Callechelys maculatus Y. T. Chu, H. L. Wu & X. B. Jin, 1981
 Callechelys marmorata (Bleeker, 1853) (Marbled snake-eel)
 Callechelys muraena D. S. Jordan & Evermann, 1887 (Blotched snake-eel)
 Callechelys papulosa McCosker, 1998
 Callechelys randalli McCosker, 1998
 Callechelys springeri (Ginsburg, 1951) (Ridgefin eel)

References

 

Ophichthidae